The Declaration of the Lillooet Tribe is an important document in the history of relations between First Nations and the governments of the Dominion of Canada and the Province of British Columbia.  Signed in Spences Bridge on May 10, 1911 by a committee of the chiefs of the St'at'imc peoples, taken down by anthropologist James Teit, a resident of Spences Bridge who lived among the Nlaka'pamux, it is an assertion of sovereignty over traditional territories as well as a protest against recent alienations of land by settlers at Seton Portage, British Columbia.  

Like the Nisga'a Declaration and other documents from the same period, the Declaration of the Lillooet Tribe points to the rising organization of native politicians in the lead-up to World War I, climaxing in the federal government's 1922 potlatch law, which banned the potlatch any assemblies of more than three First Nations males as a political meeting.  

Today the Declaration of the Lillooet Tribe is on the table as part of the St'at'imc position, but the St'at'imc are not part of the formal British Columbia Treaty Process as is also the case with other member governments of the Union of British Columbia Indian Chiefs, which rejects the process.  The smaller bands of the lower Lillooet River broke off from the Lillooet Tribal Council in order to take part in the treaty process, and are now incorporated as the In-SHUCK-ch Nation.  

That group included the N'quat'qua First Nation at D'Arcy on Anderson Lake but they are now independent of both organizations and are completely self-governing, though as with the In-SHUCK-ch maintaining cultural and family links with the other communities of the St'at'imc peoples.  Chiefs of communities of the In-SHUCK-ch in the following list are those from the Tenas Lake Band, the Samakwa Band (see Samahquam) the Skookum Chuck Band and the Port Douglas Band; (the Tenas Lake Band, near Samahquam, is now integrated with the others.)

The text of the Declaration
To Whom It May Concern:

We the underwritten chiefs of the Lillooet tribe (being all the chiefs of said tribe) declare as follows:

We speak the truth, and we speak for our whole tribe, numbering about 1400 people at the present time.

We claim that we are the rightful owners of our tribal territory, and everything pertaining thereto. We have always lived in our Country; at no time have we ever deserted it, or left it to others. We have retained it from the invasion of other tribes at the cost of our blood. Our ancestors were in possession of our Country centuries before the whites came. It is the same as yesterday when the latter came, and like the day before when the first fur trader came. We are aware the B.C. government claims our Country, like all other Indian territories in B.C.; but we deny their right to it. We never gave it nor sold it to them. They certainly never got the title to the Country from us, neither by agreement nor conquest, and none other than us could have any right to give them title. In early days we considered white chiefs like a superior race that never lied nor stole, and always acted wisely and honorably. We expected they would lay claim to what belonged to themselves only. In these considerations we have been mistaken, and gradually have learned how cunning, cruel, untruthful and thieving some of them can be. We have felt keenly the stealing of our Lands by the B.C. government, but we could never learn how to get redress. We felt helpless and dejected but lately we begin to hope. We think that perhaps after all we may get redress from the greater white chiefs away in the King's Country, or in Ottawa. It seemed to us all white chiefs and governments were against us, but now we commence to think we may yet get a measure of justice.

We have been informed of the stand taken by the Thompson River, Shuswap, and Okanagan tribes, as per their declaration of July 16th, 1910. We have learned of the Indian Rights Association of B.C., and have also heard the glad news that the Ottawa government will help us to obtain our rights. As we are in the same position in regard to our lands, etc., and labour under the same disadvantages as the other tribes of B.C., we resolved to join with them in their movement for our mutual rights. With this object, several of our chiefs attended the Indian meeting at Lytton on Feb. 13th, 1910, and again the meeting at Kamloops on the 6th Feb. last. Thereafter we held a meeting ourselves at Lillooet on the 24th Feb. last, when the chiefs of all the Lillooet bands resolved as follows:

First - That we join the other interior tribes affiliated with the Indian Rights Association of the Coast.

Second - That we stand with them in the demand for their rights, and the settlement of the Indian land question.

Third - That we agree unanimously with them in all the eight articles of their Declaration, as made at Spences Bridge, July, 1910.

In conclusion, we wish to protest against the recent seizing of certain of our lands at "The Short Portage," by white settlers on authority of the B.C. government. These lands have been continually occupied by us from time out of mind, and have been cultivated by us unmolested for over thirty years. We also wish to protest against the building of railway depots and sidings on any of our reservations, as we hear is projected. We agree that a copy of this Declaration be sent each to the Hon. Mr. Oliver, the superintendent of Indian Affairs, the Secretary of the Indian Rights Association, Mr. Clark, K.C., and Mr. McDonald, Inspector of Indian Agencies.

(Signed)
JAMES NRAITESKEL, Chief Lillooet Band
JAMES STAGER, Chief Pemberton Band
PETER CHALAL, Chief Mission Band
JAMES JAMES, Chief Seaton Lake Band
JOHN KOIUSTGHEN, Chief Pasulko Band
DAVID EKSIEPALUS, Chief No. 2 Lillooet Band
CHARLES NEKAULA, Chief Nkempts Band
JAMES SMITH, Chief Tenas Lake Band
HARRY NKASUSA, Chief Samakwa Band
PAUL KOlTELAMUGH, Chief Skookum Chuck Band
AUGUST AKSTONKAIL, Chief Port Douglas Band
JEAN BABTISTE, Chief No. 1 Cayuse Creek Band
DAVID SKWINSTWAUGH, Chief Bridge River Band
THOMAS BULL, Chief Slahoos Band
THOMAS JACK, Chief Anderson Lake Band
CHIEF FRANSOIS THOMAS ADOLPH, for La Fountain Indians
Spences Bridge, B.C. May 10th, 1911

See also
 Aboriginal peoples in Canada
 aboriginal land claims
 Unceded territory

First Nations history in British Columbia
St'at'imc
1911 in Canada
1911 documents